Cade's Road is a Roman Road in north-east England.
The road's Roman name is unknown. Although evidence exists for such a road on some parts of the proposed route, there is still some doubt regarding its exact course.

 

Examples of place names with the suffix "le-Street" : 

 Chester-le-Street, County Durham ( Concangis Roman fort )

 Thornton-le-Street, near Thirsk, North Yorkshire 

 Thorpe le Street, near Pocklington, East Riding of Yorkshire

Route

From the Humber to the Tees
Cade's Road began at Brough where there was a ferry, a Roman fort and civilian settlement (Petuaria) alongside a major Celtic settlement. The road ran northwards through Thorpe le Street and Market Weighton, before gradually turning westwards (possibly following the line of another Roman road) until it reached York (Roman Eboracum). From York it continued northwards to Thornton-le-Street near Thirsk and on to cross the River Tees (on a stone bridge now gone, but stones of which are incorporated into local buildings) near Middleton St George and Middleton One Row, where 'Pounteys Lane' is possibly named after the Roman Pons Tees (Bridge of Tees).

From the Tees to the Tyne
From the Tees the road heads north through Sadberge and then Great Stainton (also known as Stainton-le-Street) near Sedgefield. The route of the road in the Durham area is unknown, but it is thought the road passed east of Durham City, crossing the River Wear at Kepier. The road ran past the Roman fort of Concangis, located at Chester-le-Street. Concangis is the only known Roman fort on the road between York and Newcastle. From Concangis the road headed north through Birtley to Wrekenton, once a village but now a suburb of Gateshead. From Wrekenton, a branch road, known as the Wrekendyke, headed north-east to the Roman fort and harbour of Arbeia at South Shields. It has been conjectured that the site of a Roman fort exists on the golf course at Wrekenton, but this has never been confirmed. Cade's Road continued north from Wrekenton along Gateshead High Street and crossed the Tyne over the Roman bridge of Pons Aelius (Newcastle upon Tyne). It is not believed that the road continued north of Hadrian's Wall.

See also
Roman roads in Britain
Roman Britain

References

Notes

Citations

Sources

External sources
This article derives from local newspaper reports and local amateur group reports listed below:
https://web.archive.org/web/20070217044906/http://www.n-a-g.freeserve.co.uk/DOCUMENTS/ISS02_OCT98/ISS02_OCT98.htm#6
https://web.archive.org/web/20070926225336/http://www.communigate.co.uk/ne/archaeologynorth/page5.phtml
https://web.archive.org/web/20070321174841/http://www.biffvernon.freeserve.co.uk/northallerton.htm
https://web.archive.org/web/20070929083619/http://www.communigate.co.uk/ne/sadberge/page3.phtml
On verge of rewriting history, The Northern Echo, 2005-09-22. Retrieved on 2007-07-29.
http://www.northeastengland.talktalk.net/Darlington%20and%20the%20Tees%20Vale.htm

Roman roads in England
Archaeological sites in County Durham
Archaeological sites in Yorkshire
Archaeological sites in the East Riding of Yorkshire
Archaeological sites in North Yorkshire
Roman sites in North Yorkshire